Samuel Segal, Baron Segal, MRCS, LRCP, (2 April 1902 – 4 June 1985) was a British doctor and Labour Party politician who became Deputy Speaker of the House of Lords.

Early life 
Samuel Segal was the son of Moshe Zvi Segal and the elder brother of Judah Segal.  He was born at Oxford in April 1902 to a Jewish household, and moved to Newcastle upon Tyne in 1909 with his family. He was educated at the Royal Grammar School, Newcastle upon Tyne, Jesus College, Oxford (Exhibitioner; Honorary Fellow, 1966), and Westminster Hospital (Scholar).

Medical career
He was a casualty Surgeon at Westminster Hospital then a Senior Clinical Assistant at Great Ormond Street Hospital.  He served on several London County Council Hospital Committees.

Following the start of World War II, he joined RAFVR Medical Branch, October 1939.  He served in Aden 1940, Western Desert 1941, Syrian Campaign 1941.  He was attached to the Greek Air Force, 1941; Squadron Leader, 1942; Senior Medical Officer RAF Naval Co-operation Group in Mediterranean, 1942.  He was on the Headquarters Staff Middle East, 1943–44 and the Air Ministry Medical Staff, 1944–45.

He was a regional medical officer for the Ministry of Health, 1951–62.

Political career
After unsuccessfully fighting the Tynemouth seat at the 1935 general election, he was stood again unsuccessfully at the Birmingham Aston by-election in May 1939.  However, at the 1945 general election he was elected for Preston.

He advised Aneurin Bevan on the attitudes of medical practitioners to the creation of the National Health Service in 1948.  He spoke against Government policy in Palestine and in favour of the creation of Israel.

The Preston constituency was abolished for the 1950 general election, when Segal stood for the new Preston North seat, but lost by 938 votes to the Conservative candidate, Julian Amery.

On 18 December 1964, he was created a life peer as Baron Segal, of Wytham in the Royal County of Berkshire.  In the House of Lords he was Deputy Speaker and Deputy Chairman of Committees from 1973 to 1982.

Other posts
Lord Segal was chairman of the British Association for the Retarded, the National Society for Mentally Handicapped Children (now Mencap), the Anglo-Israel Association and the Anglo-Israel Archaeological Association.  He was a governor of Carmel College, and life governor of Manchester College.

Notes

References
 Who's Who
 

 Segal, Ben (1993) Sam: Lord Segal of Wytham, 1902-1985: a memoir.  (Privately published pamphlet.)

External links 
 

1902 births
1985 deaths
British Jews
Labour Party (UK) life peers 
Labour Party (UK) MPs for English constituencies
Jewish British politicians
UK MPs 1945–1950
UK MPs who were granted peerages
Alumni of Jesus College, Oxford
People educated at the Royal Grammar School, Newcastle upon Tyne
National Health Service people
20th-century English medical doctors
Royal Air Force squadron leaders
Royal Air Force Volunteer Reserve personnel of World War II
Royal Air Force Medical Service officers
Life peers created by Elizabeth II